Yaarana (याराना | ਯਾਰਾਨਾ) is a Punjabi film directed by Ranbir Pushp. The film is produced by Sukhbir Sandhar and Ranjana Kent. The film stars Gavie Chahal, Geeta Zaildar, Yuvraj Hans, and Kashish Singh in the lead roles. The film was released on 24 April 2015.

Plot
The film revolves around the common sport of football. Football is the one main thing that evokes the emotions of all kinds of people from the communities and colleges of Punjab. The film is set in the Bhai Gurdas Group of Institutes, which has the history and culture of being the best sports college in Punjab.

Cast
Gavie Chahal 
Geeta Zaildar
Yuvraj Hans 
Yuvika Chaudhary 
Kashish Singh 
Rupali Sood
Yashpal Sharma 
Dolly Minhas
Puneet Issar

Soundtrack 

The soundtrack is composed by Gurmit Singh, Gurcharan Singh, and Manoj Nayan.

References

External links 
 
Yaarana Overseas Distribution by VIP Films & Entertainment

2015 films
Punjabi-language Indian films
2010s Punjabi-language films